Dichomeris marginella, the juniper webber, is a moth of the family Gelechiidae. It is found in Europe.

The wingspan is 14–16 mm. The moths are on wing from May to August depending on the location.

The larvae feed on Juniperus communis, Juniperus chinensis, Juniperus horizontalis, Juniperus recurva and Juniperus virginiana.

References

External links

 UK Moths

marginella
Moths described in 1781
Moths of Europe
Taxa named by Johan Christian Fabricius